William Nichol (3 December 1912 – 1 June 1973) was a Scottish cricketer.

Nichol was an all-rounder made two centuries for Scotland, the first an unbeaten 139 against Warwickshire in May 1951 and the other an even hundred against Ireland a couple of months later. His best bowling performance came against the Irish three years prior, taking 7 for 39 and 5 for 39 at Glasgow

References

External links
Cricket Europe

1912 births
1973 deaths
Scottish cricketers
People from Galashiels
Sportspeople from the Scottish Borders